Anna Tivel is an American singer-songwriter from Portland, Oregon. She has released four studio albums on Portland-based Fluff & Gravy Records. Her 2017 album Small Believer received positive reviews and was named a "Top 10 underheard album of 2017" by Ann Powers of NPR. In 2019, NPR called her album The Question "one of the most ambitious folk records of 2019"; it was also listed by Paste as one of "10 essential folk albums from 2019".

Biography
Tivel was born in La Conner, Washington and grew up in a musical family, learning violin and fiddle as a child. After moving to Portland at age 18, she developed an interest in songwriting and began to write and perform her own material. Many of her songs are vignettes about the lives and struggles of ordinary people; she said in an interview "I'm drawn over and over to the small stories of people (myself included) just trying to get by, to do a little better, to feel some sort of beauty in an ugly world." Tivel's songs are often somber in tone as she has said that she "just [doesn't] trust happy songs as much".

Rolling Stone listed her as a standout performer at the 2019 AmericanaFest in Nashville, writing "In a week of countless songsmiths showcasing their attempt at that exact type of singer-songwriter storytelling, Tivel's winding, largely chorus-less tales shined and shimmered." The magazine also named the lead single from The Question, "Fenceline", a "song you need to know".

On her last album, The Question, she collaborated with engineer Brian Joseph and producer and musician Shane Leonard.

In 2021, Tivel was reported to be appearing on the podcast Storybound.

Discography
Brimstone Lullaby (2012) (as Anna and the Underbelly)
Before Machines (2014)
Heroes Waking Up (2016)
Small Believer (2017)
The Question (2019)
Blue World (2021)
Outsiders (2022)

References

American women singer-songwriters
American folk singers
Musicians from Portland, Oregon
Living people
Year of birth missing (living people)
American singer-songwriters
21st-century American women